Himouto! Umaru-chan is a Japanese anime television series based on Sankaku Head's manga for Shueisha's Weekly Young Jump magazine and produced by Doga Kobo. It follows the changing life of an eponymous girl. The series aired on ABC from July 9 to September 24, 2015, and was simulcast worldwide by Crunchyroll. An original video animation was bundled with the manga's seventh volume on October 19, 2015, with another to be bundled with the tenth volume in 2017. A second season, titled Himouto! Umaru-chan R, aired from October 8 to December 24, 2017, and was simulcast by Anime Strike, Hidive and AnimeLab. The series is licensed in North America by Sentai Filmworks.

Episode list

Himouto! Umaru-chan (2015)

OVAs

Himouto! Umaru-chan R (2017)

Notes

References

Himouto! Umaru-chan